Andrea Carlone (16 May 1626 – 4 April 1697) was an Italian painter of the Baroque period, active mainly in his natal city of Genoa.

He was the son of the painter Giovanni Battista Carlone and Niccoletta Scorza. He traveled and painted extensively through Italy. After initial work with his father, he traveled to Venice for a few years. His first works were pictures at the church of the Gesù at Perugia, and the Life of St. Felician in the church of that saint at Foligno. He went afterwards to Rome to the studio of Carlo Maratta. He married in Rome, with the sister of Perruchi, the personal secretary (Maggiordomo) for Marchese Costaguti. His brother Niccolò was also a painter.

Works

Life of St. Felician, San Feliciano (St. Felician) church, Foligno
The Glory of St. Francis Borgia
Aurora (The Dawn) (1678), National Gallery of Slovenia, Ljubljana

References

1626 births
1697 deaths
17th-century Italian painters
Italian male painters
Painters from Genoa
Italian Baroque painters
Pupils of Carlo Maratta